Kunakbayevo (Qunaqbay) is a rural locality (a selo) and the administrative centre of Kunakbayevsky Selsoviet, Uchalinsky District, Bashkortostan, Russia. The population was 750 as of 2010. There are 27 streets.

Geography 
Kunakbayevo is located 7 km northwest of Uchaly (the district's administrative centre) by road. Iltebanovo is the nearest rural locality.

References 

Rural localities in Uchalinsky District